Cerebral dysgenesis–neuropathy–ichthyosis–keratoderma syndrome  is a neurocutaneous condition caused by mutation in the SNAP29 gene.

Presentation 
CEDNIK syndrome is a rare congenital condition that presents as severe developmental failure of the nervous system and the epidermis. Clinical manifestations include microcephaly, cerebral dysgenesis, facial dysmorphism, palmoplantar keratoderma, and ichthyosis.

These children usually have a normal intrauterine life and normal birth. The first symptoms to appear are abnormal eye movements, poor head and trunk control and failure to thrive. The facial dysmorphism is characteristic with elongated faces, antimongolian eye slant, slight hypertelorism and flat broad nasal root. Palmoplantar keratoderma and ichthyosis appears  between 5 and 11 months of age. Soon features of psychomotor retardation as seen as a delay in major developmental milestones, becomes evident. Severe peripheral neuropathy is common in these children. Early macular degeneration is yet another clinical feature. Death is common by 5–10 years and is usually as a result of infection or aspiration pneumonia.

Pathophysiology 
This condition is associated with a loss-of-function mutation in SNAP29 gene, encoding a member of the SNARE family of proteins which is involved in intracellular vesicle fusion. Decrease in SNAP29 expression was found to result in abnormal lamellar granule maturation and secretion.  Lamellar granules are organelles found in the upper epidermal layers of skin and is responsible for secretion of lipids, proteases and their inhibitors to stratum corneum during the formation of epidermal barrier. Due to the abnormal  vesicle trafficking as a consequence of decreased SNAP29 there is abnormal deposition of epidermal lipids and proteases.

The abnormal gene of CEDNIK disease was mapped on chromosome 22 by Sprecher E et al.

Diagnosis 
Tendon reflexes are usually absent. Nerve conduction studies usually show decreased amplitude indicating decrease in the number of active neurons. Muscle biopsies show atrophy.

Ophthalmologic evaluation show hypoplastic optic disk and electrophysiological studies were suggestive of decreased conductance in retina and features of macular atrophy.

Mild sensorineural hearing loss is present.

Magnetic resonance imaging of the brain shows abnormalities of the corpus callosum and cortical dysplasia, with pachygyria and polymicrogyria.

See also 
 Arthrogryposis–renal dysfunction–cholestasis syndrome
 List of cutaneous conditions
 Chediak Higashi syndrome
 Griscelli syndrome
 Hermansky-Pudlak syndrome
 Sjogren Larsson syndrome

References

External links 

Genodermatoses